Hypomolis is a genus of moths in the subfamily Arctiinae erected by George Hampson in 1901.

Species
 Hypomolis aeruginosa Felder, 1874
 Hypomolis agnes Toulgoët, 1982
 Hypomolis aldaba Dognin, 1894
 Hypomolis evippus Druce, 1898
 Hypomolis fassli Rothschild, 1911
 Hypomolis lachaumei Toulgoët, 1982
 Hypomolis lymphasea Dognin, 1892
 Hypomolis ockendeni Rothschild, 1910
 Hypomolis roseicincta Dognin, 1913
 Hypomolis sanguinipectus Seitz, 1919
 Hypomolis thiaucourti Toulgoët, 1977
 Hypomolis venedictoffae Toulgoët, 1977
 Hypomolis virescens Rothschild, 1909
 Hypomolis viridella Strand, 1919
 Hypomolis viridis Druce, 1903
 Hypomolis viridoides Toulgoët, 1982

References

External links

Arctiini
Moth genera